Marwah is a valley and sub-division in the Kishtwar district of Jammu and Kashmir in India. Marwah is surrounded by the Warwan valley to the southwest, Ladakh and Zanskar to the east, Chatroo and Kishtwar to the south, and Anantnag in the west. The area is drained by river Marusudar, which is the largest tributary of Chenab.

The valley is famous for its high-quality kidney beans (Marwah Rajma).

The various tourist destinations of Marwah include Tatapani, Kishtwar National Park, Sarasnag, Mudaksar, Nun Kun, Kandinag, Fariabad Yordu Doomail and Cricket Stadium Yordu.

Demographics

Marwah sub division consists of 4 tehsils and 27 villages, according to census 2011.

Religion 
The region has a Muslim majority population, with a significant Hindu minority.

Language and Culture
The vast majority of the population speaks Kashmiri.

Culture is almost similar to that of Kashmir valley.

References

Villages in Kishtwar district